

Seewlisee (or Seewli) is a lake in Uri, Switzerland at an elevation of 2028 m. The lake lies at the foot of the Gross Windgällen.

The lake can be reached by foot in 2–3 hours from the cable car Silenen-Chilcherbergen.

See also
List of mountain lakes of Switzerland

External links
Seewli Alp 
Fischerei Uri: Seewlisee  profile

Lakes of Switzerland
Lakes of the canton of Uri